Chloe Harris is a fictional character from the ITV soap opera Emmerdale, played by Jessie Elland. She made her first appearance on 20 August 2021. Chloe was introduced as the sister of Gemma Harris, a dead teenager whose heart was given to Sarah Sugden (Katie Hill) in a transplant. Elland was attracted to the role as she felt that Chloe is a well-written character and she felt a responsibility to do the role justice when she was cast. Chloe is characterised as a sweet and genuine person who is secretly struggling with feelings of sadness, anger, and frustration. This is initially explained through her grief for her dead sister, but later into her tenure, it is revealed that she has a controlling father who is in prison. Chloe's family home is installed with several cameras and her father hires numerous people to watch over her. Eventually, Kerry Wyatt (Laura Norton), her housekeeper, helps her to escape and invites her to live with Kerry in Emmerdale village. Elland has since hinted that her father could be cast on the series in the future.

When Chloe moves into the village, she forms a relationship with Noah Dingle (Jack Downham). She eventually loses interest in him and has casual relationships with Jacob Gallagher (Joe-Warren Plant) and Nate Robinson (Jurell Carter). This led to the introduction of a stalking storyline for Chloe, when Noah forms an unhealthy and sexist obsession with Chloe. The storyline saw him tracking her location, letting himself into her room, photographing her and her belongings and eventually holding her hostage when she learns of his obsession. Elland praised Emmerdale for covering a storyline about misogyny and sexism, a topic she described as "such a relevant conversation, especially in this day and age". She also felt privileged to be given an important topical storyline. Viewers did not initially trust Chloe and were unsure of her intentions with Sarah, but as her tenure progressed, they have warmed to her.

Casting and characterisation
Jessie Elland was cast as Chloe in May 2021 and it was announced by ITV on 20 August 2021, the day her first scenes were transmitted. The initial audition for the role was a self-tape video, and a week after submitting it, Elland was invited into the Emmerdale studios for a screen test. She joked that the studios reminded her of an IKEA shop due to the sets being next to each other in a "maze of rooms"; she was also "in awe at the attention to detail in each set". She was nervous for the screen test since it was her first in-person audition in her career, but considered herself lucky to be doing a scene with Karen Blick. One week later, Elland received a phone call from her agent to inform her that she had secured the role. A week after being cast, Elland began filming, an experience she described as a "whirlwhind" due to the fast-paced nature of the soap. She looked forward to her costume fitting and was pleasantly surprised by the costuming the team had devised for Chloe. She was also grateful to the team for allowing her to keep her natural red hair colour for the character, since she did not feel that darker hair would suit her.

It was confirmed that Chloe's entrance would be linked to Sarah Sugden (Katie Hill) and she was introduced as the sister of Gemma Harris, a dead teenager whose heart was given to Sarah in a heart transplant three years prior to her introduction. When she received information on the character, Elland felt that Chloe was well-written and felt a responsibility to put lots of work into the role and "do the part justice". Chloe is characterised as "very sweet and genuine, eager to please and make connections with people, but underneath it all she is struggling with a lot of sadness, anger, and frustration." Elland explained that the darker side of Chloe has come from experiences throughout her life that have made her old beyond her years, which she felt had given Chloe determination to go out and get what she wants. She also said how Chloe is not afraid to speak her mind and that she is used to getting what she wants. Elland initially found it difficult to relate to her character since she found her to be "naïve, vulnerable, and super sweet". However, as she got further into her tenure, she discovered similarities to Chloe, with one example being that they both value sisterhood. She also resonated with Chloe's determined streak.

Development

Meeting Sarah Sugden and troubled family life
Prior to her arrival, Leeds Live wrote that Chloe's storyline with Sarah would form a major storyline on the soap. Chloe's reason for looking for Sarah comes from a place of desperation since she feels desperate to talk about Gemma and the memories she has of her, since that opportunity had been denied by her family. Elland said that another reason was due to wanting a good thing to come from something as tragic as losing her sister. When the pair first meet, Chloe has "a lot of expectations, worries, and questions" and places a lot of pressure on both herself and Sarah. The meeting is unsuccessful when both of the characters get overwhelmed and due to the failure, Chloe experiences "an even bigger mix of emotions" but feels grounded when she eventually forms a friendship with Sarah. Elland confirmed that despite their initial friendship, there would be "a rocky road ahead" in the pair's storyline.

When she meets with Sarah, Chloe receives numerous phone calls which she averts and then suddenly declares that she has to leave. Viewers predicted that these hints had formed the start of a "sinister storyline" for the character. In scenes aired in September 2021, Chloe opens up to Sarah and Noah Dingle (Jack Downham) about her troubled family life. She admits that she is lonely without her sister, as well as that her father is not present in her life, and she eventually "crumbles into tears". Sarah becomes puzzled about Chloe's home life when she makes a habit of gifting Sarah expensive jewellery. After much speculation from viewers about Chloe's intentions with Sarah, her home life was explored on-screen in November 2021. Laura Norton, who plays Chloe's housekeeper Kerry Wyatt, revealed that Chloe is "mistreated and controlled" by her father Damon, who is in prison, as well as the men who he employs.

Norton said in the off-screen time that the characters have spent together, Kerry has become protective over Chloe. Kerry knows that Damon is a dangerous man and is scared of him, but is trusted with responsibilities aside from cleaning that include interacting with Chloe, which led to their bond. Norton added although Damon is in prison, he is aware of everything that happens in the house. She explained: "He's got men working for him that watch every move she makes, and his daughter makes. CCTV in every room in the house, they're being watched, they're being followed. Everything they spend, everywhere they go, every conversation they have. They have to be incredibly careful." When asked what she pictures when she thinks of Damon, Elland said that she imagines him to be a "stereotypical Northern man with a big ginger beard" and named Sean Bean as an example. Chloe eventually moves in with Kerry. Chloe and Amy Wyatt (Natalie Ann Jamieson) are "on guard with each other at first" but they eventually form a sisterly bond, which Elland said was an interesting dynamic to explore. Elland found it interesting that Damon, an off-screen character, had had such an influence on Chloe's personality, but hinted that he could eventually appear on the soap after he leaves prison. The actress was enthusiastic about the potential of introducing Damon and opined that a lot could happen for Chloe if the "gangster" arrived.

Relationship with Noah Dingle and stalking ordeal

Upon her casting, Metros Duncan Lindsay confirmed that Chloe would form a friendship with Noah. Eventually, Noah forms romantic feelings for Chloe, which disgusts Sarah since she feels that he will ruin her friendship with Chloe. He begins telling people that she is his girlfriend, which Chloe is shocked to learn. However, after meeting him in secret a few times, Chloe forms romantic feelings for Noah, which their families are not pleased about. Kerry and Noah's mother Charity (Emma Atkins) ban the pair from seeing each other, due to feeling that their relationship would bring trouble for both families. Elland compared the couple's situation to Romeo and Juliet and noted that they see each other as a "way to be happy and free". In a bid to be together, they plan an escape from the village, and Chloe begins to see Noah as an "escape route" from her controlling father. She confirmed that although her character does like Noah, but her main reason for executing the plan is to escape her home. However, they are soon found and took back home. Elland said that the runaway scenes were fun to film since she enjoyed working with Downham on location and the weather was nice at the time.

After Chloe loses interest in Noah, she has sex with Jacob Gallagher (Joe-Warren Plant). She is hurt when he claims that it was "just sex" to him, and after Noah learns of it, he loses his temper and brands her a "dirty slapper". He attempts to apologise to Chloe and brings her flowers, but she affirms that he is toxic and his wording was unacceptable. He snaps once again, throwing the flowers across the room and calling her a "village bike". The Metros Calli Kitson worried for Chloe if Noah were to show more of his "sexism and toxic attitude". Lindsay (Metro) later confirmed that the story regarding Noah and Chloe was heading in a dark direction and said that he is capable of evil to pursue Chloe, despite her not wanting a relationship. Chloe spends the night with Nate Robinson (Jurell Carter), which Noah discovers. In an attempt to get Chloe back on his good side, he offers to take her for a drink to which she declines. Noah is "left angered by the apparent lack of reward for his apology" and is angered further when he learns of Chloe's fling with Nate.

Speaking on the storyline, Elland said that Chloe had set her sights on Nate, who rejects her. Chloe then has to "deal with not getting her own way" and Noah takes advantage of Chloe's vulnerable state by getting close to her. His sudden change of attitude leads her to think Noah has "turned over a new leaf" and makes her keen to patch up her bond with him. However, Chloe sees her connection to Noah as a friendship. Elland explained that Chloe is engrossed in her feelings for Nate which means she cannot see that Noah's dishonest apologies and bad attitude. Chloe enjoys having somebody to confide in, but Elland confirmed that the storyline would eventually take a twist. She praised Emmerdale for covering a storyline about misogyny and sexism, a topic she described as "such a relevant conversation, especially in this day and age". She also felt privileged to be given an important topical storyline. Noah buys Chloe concert tickets, but uninterested in going with him, she leaves him for Nate. This leaves Noah "feeling vengeful" and a "dark choice" leads him to steal her phone. He plants a tracker on her phone so that he can show up in the same places as her, which he claims are coincidences. He pretends to have found her missing phone, and with Chloe thankful for him, he uses Chloe's gratitude to his advantage by getting her to agree to a date. Later, he buys a drone and flies it outside her bedroom window, recording her. Noah then steals her keys, lets himself into her bedroom and snoops around, taking photographs of her belongings, including her underwear drawer. However, she comes home unexpectedly, and he hides in her wardrobe.

In early May 2022, Chloe was featured as "the storyline of the week" when Noah takes her hostage. Chloe is horrified to find thousands of photographs of herself and her belongings on her laptop which prove that he has been stalking her for weeks. She confronts him on the photographs, and Noah reacts badly, by refusing to let her leave and holding her mouth as she tries to scream for help. Downham, who portrays Noah, said that in his research for the storyline, he learned that many stalkers do not realise what they are doing is wrong. He found that Noah is the same, as he believes he is just trying to get Chloe's attention. On the impact Noah's stalking has on Chloe, Elland said that she is not only disgusted by his behaviour, but also reminded of how her father treated her. It affects Chloe especially since Noah knew how she had been treated by Damon, a piece of information that Elland found crucial to use when portraying how shaken Chloe is. On his comeuppance, Chloe feels conflicted. This is due to her wanting him to face justice for his cruel actions, but since he was someone that "she really liked and had a relationship with", her feelings almost hold her back. She also feels scared of the Dingle family's support for him. Elland found the character's response interesting from an acting perspective since Chloe is a strong character who wants to "put on a brave face" and appear okay, but inside, there is a lot going on. Despite his constant belief that he has done nothing wrong to Chloe, he pleads guilty in court and is sentenced to three months in prison.

Reception
Elland was shocked to have been recognised after only one of her episodes had been transmitted. She was out with a friend in Leeds and was pleasantly surprised to be approached by a viewer of the show who said they were a fan of hers and wanted a photo with her. Elland found that viewers did not initially trust Chloe and were protective of her intentions with Sarah. However, once she had been developed beyond the storyline with Sarah, she found that people were "starting to warm to her".

See also
 List of Emmerdale characters (2021)

References

Emmerdale characters
Female characters in television
Teenage characters in television
Fictional victims of crime
Television characters introduced in 2021
Adoptee characters in television